Al-Malikiyah Municipal Airfield is a basic aerodrome serving Al-Malikiyah (also known as Dêrik or Dayrik), a small city in far northeastern Syria.

Facilities
As it is predominantly used by agricultural aviation as well as for limited General aviation, it only has very basic facilities.

During Syrian Civil War
The Aerodrome is controlled by the People's Protection Units on behalf of the Jazira Canton, after they and the Women's Protection Units captured the Al-Malikiyah District at the beginning  of the Syrian Civil War.

In January 2016 it was reported that the US Military were planning to create an airforce base at Rmelan or in this location in order to increase the capacity of their military training operations to upskill the Syrian Democratic Forces.

References

Airports in Syria
Al-Hasakah Governorate